Frank Lombardi (born in Providence, Rhode Island) is an American politician and a Democratic member of the Rhode Island Senate representing District 26 since January 2013.

Education
Lombardi earned his BA in business from Providence College and his JD from Northeastern University School of Law.

Elections
2012 When District 26 Democratic Senator Beatrice Lanzi retired and left the seat open, Lombardi ran in the September 11, 2012 Democratic Primary, winning with 1,061 votes (73.7%), and was unopposed for the November 6, 2012 General election, winning with 7,009 votes (63.3%) against Republican nominee Sean Gately.

References

External links
Official page at the Rhode Island General Assembly

Frank Lombardi at Ballotpedia
Frank S. Lombardi at OpenSecrets

Living people
Northeastern University School of Law alumni
Politicians from Cranston, Rhode Island
Politicians from Providence, Rhode Island
Providence College alumni
Rhode Island lawyers
Democratic Party Rhode Island state senators
21st-century American politicians
1962 births